Sechelt Aerodrome  is located  south southeast of the centre of Sechelt, British Columbia, Canada.

See also
Sechelt/Porpoise Bay Water Aerodrome

References

External links
Sechelt-Gibsons Airport on COPA's Places to Fly airport directory
District of Sechelt official page on the Sechelt Airport

Registered aerodromes in British Columbia
Sunshine Coast Regional District
Sechelt